Byfjorden (Norwegian Nynorsk and Bokmål: /byːfjɔrn/, /-ɔɾn/; Bokmål: also /-ɔɳ/; Bergensk: usually /-ɔʁn/) is a fjord in Vestland county, Norway. The western entrance to Byfjorden is between the village of Drotningsvik in Laksevåg borough, Bergen, and the village of Marikoven on the island of Askøy in Askøy municipality. The northern entrance to the fjord is between the village of Ask on Askøy and Mjølkeråen in the borough of Åsane in Bergen. On the northern end, it connects with the Salhusfjorden and Herdlefjorden. There is one road crossing over the Byfjorden: the Askøy Bridge, which crosses near the western end of the fjord. The name literally means city-fjord, and it is so named because of its importance as a transportation route into and out of the city of Bergen.

Arms and bays

Bergen
 Åstveitvågen
 Eidsvågen
 Breiviken
 Sandviken
 Vågen
 Puddefjorden
 Damsgårdssundet
 Store Lungegårdsvann
 Gravdalsbukten
 Kjøkkelvika
 Olsvika
 Godvik
 Breivika

Askøy
 Strusshamn
 Klampavika
 Kyllaren
 Florvågen
 Bakarvågen
 Erdalsvågen
 Olavika
 Hopshamna
 Askehamna

References

Geography of Bergen
Askøy
Fjords of Vestland